The Benefit Company (TBC) is the local switch in the Kingdom of Bahrain handling ATM and POS transactions among other services. Established in 1997 with a special license from the Central Bank of Bahrain as "Provider of Ancillary Services to the Financial Sector", it is the only financial network of its kind in the country.

ATM and POS
Benefit's initial services included connecting the ATM services of the local banks in Bahrain and handling the settlements.  In addition, it connected the POS terminals to all the local issuers in the Kingdom.

GCCNET
In addition to local switching, Benefit is also connected to GCC Net, the main switch operating on all GCC countries. A connection was also established with Shetab in 2005; linking all BENEFIT users with Iran's only switch.

Payment gateway
In 2006, the company offered the payment gateway service, integrating more of the local banks onto one payment hub, allowing banks and their merchants to perform online transactions.

Electronic check clearing
In May 2012, Benefit started running the nation's check truncation system.  Thus, enabling 29 banks in the Kingdom to settle checks the same day.

Member banks in the network
Arab Bank Ltd.
Bank al Habib
Bank of Bahrain and Kuwait
Citibank
HSBC
Shamil Bank of Bahrain
Kuwait Finance House
National Bank of Bahrain
Standard Chartered Bank
Bahrain Islamic Bank
Ahli United Bank
Bahraini Saudi Bank
Citibank
National Bank of Kuwait
National Bank of Abu Dhabi
Khaleeji Commercial Bank
Mashreq Bank
Al Salam Bank
Eskan Bank
ICICI Bank
State Bank of India

See also

ATM
POS

References

External links
 The Benefit Company's Main Site
 Central Bank of Bahrain's Main Site
 GCCNet's main web site

1997 establishments in Bahrain
Banks established in 1997
Banks of Bahrain
Interbank networks